The fourth and final season of the American comedy-drama television series Ugly Betty was confirmed in the ABC lineup, which was picked up for a full season on April 23, 2009. The season premiered on October 16, 2009 and ended with the series finale on April 14, 2010.

Outside the United States, Season 4 began airing on digital channel 7TWO on Tuesdays at 7:30pm from April 13, 2010 in Australia. It also began airing in the UK on Wednesday August 11, at 9 pm. Unlike the previous 3 seasons, Ugly Betty is now being shown on the digital channel E4, while the repeat telecast can be watched on Channel 4 on the weekend. This move is said to be due to the decline in ratings of the previous season which was shown on Channel 4. Season 4 completed its 20-episode run by Wednesday December 22, 2010.

The season had been shifted to the Friday night death slot and ratings for the first 8 episodes were extremely low (especially the seventh which became the all-time lowest rated episode). On December 2, 2009, ABC confirmed that Ugly Betty would be moving to Wednesday nights after Christmas 2009, due to Eastwick'''s cancellation. However, ratings did not improve and ABC lowered the episode count from an original 22 ordered to just 20.
On January 27, 2010, ABC announced the show would not be brought back for a fifth season.

Cast
Most of the main cast from the show's third season returned for the fourth season, with the former main character Christina McKinney (played by Ashley Jensen) making a guest appearance near the end of the season. Daniel Eric Gold was promoted to the main cast as Matt Hartley, having appeared in a recurring capacity during Season 3. Yaya DaCosta took over the recurring role of Nico Slater, who was played in the first season by Jowharah Jones. Before the season began, Max Ehrich, who played Justin's classmate Randy, reported on his Twitter account that he would return on a recurring basis, but this turned out not to be true.

Some guest stars gave hints to what viewers could expect. For example, Kristen Johnston revealed that she would be playing a character called Helen. She has said that she will be like Amanda in her later years in a tragic way. Johnston made three appearances in this role during this season.

Shakira played herself in a cameo role in "The Bahamas Triangle", in which she helped to get a Mode photo shoot back on track. Throughout the series' run, Shakira had been referred to on a number of occasions by various characters.

The fourth season saw guest appearances by the brothers of two of the show's stars. Becki Newton's brother Matt took on the recurring role of Marc's new boyfriend Troy, and Vanessa Williams's brother Chris landed an appearance as drag queen "Wilheldiva Hater", whom Wilhelmina enlisted for another one of her schemes.

Main cast
 America Ferrera as Betty Suarez
 Vanessa L. Williams as Wilhelmina Slater
 Eric Mabius as Daniel Meade
 Judith Light as Claire Meade
 Michael Urie as Marc St. James
 Becki Newton as Amanda Tanen
 Ana Ortiz as Hilda Suarez
 Tony Plana as Ignacio Suarez
 Mark Indelicato as Justin Suarez
 Daniel Eric Gold as Matt Hartley

Recurring cast
 Ashley Jensen as Christina McKinney
 Christopher Gorham as Henry Grubstick
 Freddy Rodriguez as Gio Rossi
 Grant Bowler as Connor Owens
 Yaya DaCosta as Nico Slater
 Ralph Macchio as Archie Rodriguez
 Alec Mapa as Suzuki St. Pierre
 David Rasche as Calvin Hartley
 Jamie-Lynn Sigler as Natalie
 Smith Cho as Megan
 Adam Rodriguez as Bobby
 Dylan Baker as Bennett Wallis
 Matt Newton as Troy
 Kristen Johnston as Helen
 Neal Bledsoe as Tyler Meade-Hartley
 Ryan McGinnis as Austin

Guest cast
 Chris Williams as Wilheldiva Hater
 Brooklyn Decker as Lexie
 Shakira as herself
 Christie Brinkley as Penelope Graybridge
 RuPaul as Rudolph
 Carlos Leon as Diego Martinez
 Jesse Tyler Ferguson as Dr. Farkas
 Christine Ebersole as Frances
 Rich Sommer as Jimmy
 Aaron Tveit as Zachary Boule
 Kathy Najimy as Dr. Frankel

Episodes

Notes:
 Episodes 66–74 aired on Fridays (October 16, 2009 December 11, 2009).
 Episodes 75–85 aired on Wednesdays (January 6, 2010 April 14, 2010).
 Season 4 was originally slated to have a total of 22 episodes but was reduced to 20 episodes.

DVD release
Walt Disney Studios Home Entertainment release of Ugly Betty Season Four, subtitled "From Poncho, to Honcho", would be August 17, 2010 in the United States and Canada. All 20 episodes were included in the set, along with additional bonus tracks.

Among the features:
Betty Goes Bahamas – Follow the hilarious misadventures of Michael Urie and Becki Newton as they search for their fellow cast members during a location shoot in the Bahamas.Mode After Hours – Webisodes
"Stress-Orcism"
"Role Playing"
"Queenseeker"	
"Harassment of a Sexual Nature"
Betty Bloops
Deleted Scenes
Audio Commentary

US Ratings

UK Ratings
The fourth season was broadcast on Wednesday nights at 9 pm on E4, and an hour later on E4 +1.

a Viewers in thousands.
All viewer figures and weekly ranks are from BARB.

Production
Production for the fourth season began in July 2009. The cast headed to The Bahamas in October 2009 to shoot the episode "The Bahamas Triangle" on location at the Atlantis Resort and Casino. The series wrapped up filming in the United Kingdom in April 2010.

Scheduling
ABC announced that starting with the fourth season, the show would move to Friday nights starting October 16, 2009 (pushed back from the original date, October 9).
Citytv aired the fourth season to Canada at the same date and time slot as ABC when the show aired on Fridays. Once the Wednesday move was finalized, Citytv (in Ontario and Alberta) was unable to accommodate the show for Wednesdays (due to a scheduling conflict with The Jay Leno Show) but can still be seen on Omni Television (OMNI 1). In Winnipeg and Vancouver, its Citytv stations there continue to air the show, but at an earlier time slot than its ABC broadcast.

Due to the cancellation of The Jay Leno Show, Ugly Betty returned to Citytv in Canada in March 2010 and aired Wednesdays at 10 on Citytv, the same time as it did in the USA.
Rumors have come out that because Eastwick has been canceled, Ugly Betty may be moving to Wednesday nights after Christmas. ABC says that moving Ugly Betty to Wednesdays will complement their hit sitcoms Modern Family and Cougar Town. On December 2, ABC confirmed that Ugly Betty would be moving to Wednesday nights after Christmas, due to Eastwick's'' cancellation. But this move did not improve the ratings and on January 27, 2010 ABC announced that it was cancelling the series. However, it did allow the show's creators to give the series a proper ending. Although the series has finished its run on TV, there is the possibility that some of the completed storylines might have left hints that it might become a blueprint for a film.

References

Ugly Betty
2009 American television seasons
2010 American television seasons